Darren Graham Mackie (born 5 January 1982) is a Scottish former footballer who, most recently, played for Inverurie Loco Works as a player/coach. Mackie was born in Inverurie, Aberdeenshire, Scotland and previously played as a striker for Aberdeen in the Scottish Premier League between 1998 and 2012, with a loan spell at Inverness Caledonian Thistle in 2004.

Club career

Aberdeen
Mackie, a product of the Aberdeen youth system, started his professional career with the club in 1998. He also had a brief loan spell at Inverness Caledonian Thistle in 2004.

Inverness CT (loan)
In January 2004, Mackie moved on loan to Inverness Caledonian Thistle. He made six league appearances for Inverness, but failed to score a goal and returned to Aberdeen at the end of the season.

Return to Aberdeen
He scored 15 goals for Aberdeen in the 2004–05 season – including twelve in the league – which helped his team to a fourth-place finish, but they just missed out on UEFA Cup qualification. On 22 August 2006, Mackie missed a decisive penalty in a shock 5–3 penalty shootout league cup defeat to Third Division side Queen's Park. He finished the 2006–07 season with 13 league goals, including one very bizarre one in a match against Kilmarnock on 28 April 2007. Kilmarnock goalkeeper Alan Combe attempted to throw the ball to one of his teammates, but Mackie, who was walking away from goal, was instead hit on the back of his head by Combe's throw and the ball rebounded over the helpless keeper into the net.

Aberdeen finished third in the SPL in the 2006–07 season and therefore qualified for the 2007–08 UEFA Cup first round, where they faced Ukrainian club Dnipro. The first leg of the tie on 20 September 2007 at Pittodrie ended goalless, but in the second-leg, Mackie netted the opening goal, his 50th goal for Aberdeen. He headed in from close range after a pinpoint cross by Ricky Foster. The match ended 1–1 with Andriy Vorobey scoring the equaliser for Dnipro, but Mackie's strike ensured Aberdeen's progress to the group stages of the tournament on away goals and secured a substantial financial windfall for the club. Mackie also scored the only goal of the game against Celtic at Celtic Park in the Scottish Cup quarter-final replay on 18 March 2008.

Mackie scored his 50th league goal for Aberdeen on 20 December 2008 in an SPL match against Inverness Caledonian Thistle at the Caledonian Stadium and signed a new three-year contract with the Dons in February 2009.

On 19 July 2011, Aberdeen played La Liga side Villarreal at Pittodrie in a testimonial match to mark Mackie's thirteen years with the club. The match ended 1–0 to Villarreal, with striker Giuseppe Rossi scoring the only goal after 53 minutes. Near the end of the 2011–12 season, Mackie was advised that his contract with Aberdeen would not be extended. Mackie played his last game for Aberdeen in a goalless draw against St Mirren on 12 May.

Phoenix FC
On 27 September 2012, Mackie signed a one-year contract with Phoenix FC of the USL Pro. His time at Phoenix was not a successful one. He was sidelined with a groin injury in the early part of the season.  His contract was not renewed and he returned to Scotland after the season ended.

Turriff United
Mackie joined Turriff United in 2013 as a first team player until August 2016.

Inverurie Loco Works
Mackie was announced as a player/coach at the club as of Wednesday, 1 September 2016.

In June 2017, he announced that he was leaving both roles at Inverurie Loco Works – citing business commitments.

International career
On 30 January 2007, Alex McLeish named Mackie in the Scotland B team to play Finland B at Rugby Park, Kilmarnock on 7 February.

Career statistics
Correct as of 1 July 2012

Honours
Out of Context Aberdeen FC Hall of Fame (2020)

References

External links

1982 births
Living people
People from Inverurie
Scottish footballers
Scottish expatriate footballers
Scotland B international footballers
Association football forwards
Aberdeen F.C. players
Inverness Caledonian Thistle F.C. players
Phoenix FC players
Scottish Premier League players
Scottish Football League players
USL Championship players
Expatriate soccer players in the United States
People educated at Kemnay Academy
Inverurie Loco Works F.C. players
Scottish expatriate sportspeople in the United States
Footballers from Aberdeenshire